Aprostocetus is a genus of hymenopteran insects of the family Eulophidae. The genus was erected by John O. Westwood in 1833. This very large group (about 800 described species) of parasitoid wasps has a global distribution.

Species

Widespread species

A. antiguensis – Caribbean, Florida
A parasitoid recorded on the coccid scale insect Ceroplastes floridensis and the tischeriid moth Tischeria heliopsisella
A. asthenogmus – Palaearctic, North Africa, Indomalaya, Seychelles, Caribbean
A parasitoid of blattid cockroaches of the genus Periplaneta
A. beatus – Australia (Queensland), Oceania, southern Africa
A parasitoid of various bugs – members of the families Cicadellidae, Delphacidae and Tropiduchidae are recorded as hosts
A. bruzzonis – Holarctic
A parasitoid of tortoise beetles of the genus Cassida
A. ceroplastae -Holarctic, Near East and also introduced into parts of Africa and Australia for biocontrol purposes
A parasitoid of various coccid scale insects
A. crino – Holarctic, Indomalaya
A parasitoid of crickets of the genus Oecanthus
A. diplosidis – Cosmopolitan
A parasitoid on various gall midges
A. dubius – Indonesia, New Guinea
A parasitoid of katydids in the Sexavaini
A. fasciatus – Northern South America, Caribbean, India
A parasitoid of various gall midges
A. fidius – Central and southern United States, Caribbean
A parasitoid of various gall midges
A. formosanus – Hawaii, South East Asia, Madagascar
A parasitoid on various delphacid bugs
A. gala – Caribbean, Florida, Australia, India
A parasitoid recorded on various gall midges and curculionid weevils
A. hagenowii – Cosmopolitan, used in North America for biocontrol of cockroaches
A parasitoid of various cockroaches, also recorded from bark beetles and evaniid wasps
A. leucone – Holarctic
A. longicauda – Holarctic
A. marylandensis – Central and eastern United States, Caribbean
A parasitoid recorded on a wide range of hosts including gall midges, curculionid weevils, aphidid aphids, gelechiid and tortricid moths and fellow eulophids
A. megameli – Philippines, Hawaii
A parasitoid on the delphacid bug Megamelus proserpina
A. microcosmus – Holarctic, Neotropical and Afrotropical regions, Indomalaya and Australia
Host unknown but associated with Hyparrhenia hirta
A. microscopicus – Holarctic
A parasitoid on various gall midges
A. minutus – Holarctic, Neotropical, North Africa
A parasitoid recorded on a huge range of hosts including many Coleoptera, Hemiptera, Hymenoptera and Neuroptera
A. neglectus – Holarctic, North Africa, Near East and Indomalaya
A parasitoid on various lady beetles, also recorded on the aphidid aphid Myzus cerasi
A. niger – Indomalaya, Australia
A parasitoid on the triozid bug Trioza fletcheri
A. pallipes – Holarctic
A parasitoid on various gall midges, also recorded on the eriocraniid moth Eriocrania semipurpurella
A. pausiris – Holarctic
A parasitoid recorded on the gall midge Dasineura leguminicola and chloropid flies of the genus Lipara
A. percaudatus – Europe, India
A parasitoid of crickets of the genus Oecanthus
A. pygmaeus – Holarctic
A parasitoid on various gall midges and apid bees
A. sicarius – Former Yugoslavia, Africa, Near East
A parasitoid recorded on various coccid scale insects and the buprestid beetle Agrilus sinuatus
A. sobrius – Nearctic, Russia
A parasitoid of gall midges of the genus Asphondylia, also recorded on a fellow chalcidoid, the eurytomid Bruchophagus gibbus
A. strobilanae – Holarctic
A parasitoid recorded on various gall midges and tortricid moths, also recorded on a fellow chalcidoid, the torymid Torymus azureus
A. terebrans – Holarctic
A. toddaliae – Near East, Madagascar
A parasitoid of coccid scale insects of the genus Ceroplastes
A. venustus – Holarctic
A parasitoid recorded on various gall midges and eurytomid wasps of the genus Bruchophagus
A. zosimus – Holarctic, North Africa and New Zealand
A parasitoid recorded on a very wide range of insects including Diptera, Lepidoptera and Hymenoptera. Parasitized in turn by the eupelmid Eupelmus allynii

Palaearctic species

A. aartseni – Greece
A. acron – Czech Republic
A. aega – Palaearctic
A parasitoid of the gall midge Dasineura glechomae
A. aethiops – Palaearctic
Recorded as a parasitoid on a variety of insects including bean weevils, gall midges, gall wasps and other chalcidoids (family Eurytomidae)
A. agevilleae – Italy, Slovakia
A parasitoid of the gall midge Agevillea abietis
A. agrus – Palaearctic
A. albae – China (Shaanxi province)
A parasitoid of the bark beetle Cryphalus exiguus
A. alveatus – Palaearctic, North Africa
A parasitoid recorded on the gall midge Massalongia rubra and the gall wasp Rhodites mayri
A. amenon – Palaearctic
A parasitoid of the gall midge Dasineura ulmariae
A. andalusicus – Spain
A parasitoid of gall wasps of the genus Plagiotrochus
A. annulatus – Central Europe
A parasitoid recorded on the gall midge Asphondylia sarothamni and some coccid scale insects
A. anodaphus – Palaearctic
A parasitoid of the gall midge Rhopalomyia ptarmicae
A. apama – Palaearctic
A parasitoid of various gall midges
A. apiculatus – Palaearctic
A. aquaticus – Palaearctic
Host unknown but associated with Phragmites australis
A. aquilus – Britain
A parasitoid of the gall midge Dasineura trifolii
A. arathis – Britain
A. arenarius – Europe
A. aristaeus – Palaearctic
A. arrabonicus – Palaearctic
Host unknown but associated with Alopecurus pratensis
A. arsenjevi – Far eastern Russia
A. artemisiae – Palaearctic
A parasitoid of gall midges of the genus Rhopalomyia
A. artemisicola – Palaearctic
A parasitoid of the gall midge Contarinia artemisiae
A. askewi – France
Host unknown but associated with Daucus carota
A. atticus – Greece
A parasitoid of gall midges of the genus Cystiphora
A. aurantiacus – Palaearctic
A parasitoid of gall wasps of the genus Diplolepsis
A. avetjanae – Armenia
A parasitoid of the gall wasp Diplolepsis fructuum
A. azoricus – Azores
A. bakkendorfi – Denmark
A parasitoid associated with gall producing insects on Astragalus glycyphyllos
A. balasi – Central Europe
A parasitoid of moths – recorded on gracillariids of the genus Phyllocnistis and the tortricid Pseudargyrotoza conwagana
A. beringi – Far eastern Russia
A. beroe – Britain
A. beyazus  – Iran
A. biorrhizae – Palaearctic
A parasitoid of the gall wasp Biorhiza pallida (which causes oak apples)
A. blandus – Far eastern Russia
A. blastophagusi – China (Heilongjiang)
A parasitoid of the bark beetles Ips subelongatus and Tomicus pilifer
A. boreus – Europe
A parasitoid of the tephritid fruit flies Euleia heraclei and Philophylla heraclei
A. bouceki – Spain
A. brachycerus – Palaearctic
A parasitoid on various gall midges, also recorded on the nepticulid moth Nepticula argyropeza
A. brevipennis – Czech Republic, Slovakia
A. bucculentus – Armenia, Turkey, Israel
A parasitoid on a fellow chalcidoid – the eurytomid Eurytoma amygdali
A. calamarius – Palaearctic
A parasitoid on various gall midges
A. calvus – Palaearctic
A parasitoid recorded on the cockroach Loboptera decipiens and the evaniid wasp Zeuxevania splendidula
A. capitigenae – Palaearctic
A parasitoid on the gall midge Bayeria capitigena
A. capnopterus – Southern Europe
A. catius – Palaearctic
A. caudatus – Palaearctic
A parasitoid on the gall midge Dasineura alopecuri
A. cebennicus – France
A. cecidomyiarum – Palaearctic
A parasitoid on various gall midges, also recorded on the gall wasp Biorhiza pallida (which causes oak apples)
A. celtidis – Europe
A parasitoid on leaf beetles of the genus Pyrrhalta, also recorded on the gracillariid moth Lithocolletis lantanella
A. cerricola – Palaearctic
A parasitoid on the gall midge Macrodiplosis dryobia
A. chakassicus – Russia
A parasitoid on the gall midge Dasineura rozhkovi
A. ciliatus – Palaearctic
A parasitoid on the gall midge Rabdophaga heterobia
A. citrinus – Palaearctic
A parasitoid on various gall midges, also recorded on the gall wasp Aylax rogenhoferi
A. citripes – Europe
A parasitoid on various dytiscid beetles, also recorded on the lasiocampid moth Dendrolimus pini
A. clavicornis – Palaearctic
A parasitoid recorded on various gall midges, aphids and scale insects
A. claviger – Palaearctic
A. coccidiphagus – Britain
A parasitoid on kermesid scale insects of the genus Kermes
A. collega – Europe
A parasitoid on various gall midges
A. constrictus – Palaearctic
A parasitoid recorded on brentid beetles of the genus Apion and gall midges of the genus Oligotrophus
A. cracens – Southern Europe, Turkey
A parasitoid on the buprestid beetle Coraebus rubi
A. craneiobiae – Northern Europe
A parasitoid on various gall midges
A. crassiceps – Central Europe
A. crypturgus – China (Shaanxi province)
A parasitoid on various bark beetles
A. csokakoensis – Palaearctic
A. culminis – France
A. cultratus – Britain
A. curtivena – France
A. cycladum – Greece
Host unknown but associated with Thymelaea hirsuta
A. cyniphidum – Central Europe
A parasitoid on various gall wasps
A. dauci – - Palaearctic
A parasitoid on various gall midges
A. debilitatus – France
A. deceptor – France
A. dendroctoni – China (Guizhou province)
A parasitoid on various bark and longhorn beetles
A. deobensis – Palaearctic
A parasitoid on the tenthredinid sawfly Pontania viminalis
A. dezhnevi – Far eastern Russia
A. distichus – Central Europe
A. diversus – Palaearctic
A parasitoid recorded on a wide range of insects including curculionid weevils, gall midges and gracillariid and lyonetiid moths
A. doksyensis – Czech Republic
A. domenichinii – Palaearctic
A parasitoid on various gall midges and gall wasps
A. dotus – Britain
A parasitoid of the gall midge Dasineura ulmariae
A. dryocoetae – Sweden
A. dryocosmi – China (Zhejiang province)
A parasitoid on the gall wasp Dryocosmus kuriphilus
A. durmitorensis – former Yugoslavia
A. elegantulus – France
A. eleuchia – Western Europe
A parasitoid of the gall midge Cystiphora sonchi
A. elongatus – Europe, Near East
A parasitoid of variouschalcidoids and gall midges
A. emesa – Palaearctic
A parasitoid on the gall midge Dasineura alopecuri
A. epicharmus – Palaearctic
A parasitoid on various gall midges
A. epilobiellus – Netherlands
A parasitoid on the gall midge Dasineura epilobii
A. epilobii – Central Europe
A parasitoid on the gall midge Dasineura epilobii
A. eratus – Britain
A. ericae – France
A parasitoid on the gall midge Cecidomyia ericoscopariae
A. eriophyes – Europe, Near East
A parasitoid on various eriophyid mites
A. ermaki – Far eastern Russia
A. escherichi – Palaearctic
A parasitoid on various gall midges
A. esherensis – Britain
A. euagoras – Britain
A. eupatorii – Palaearctic
A. eupolis – Britain
A. eurystoma – Palaearctic
A. eurytomae – Palaearctic, Near East
A parasitoid on various gall wasps – also recorded on the eurytomid Eurytomus rosae
A. eurytus – Europe
A parasitoid recorded on a wide range of insects including apionid beetles, ledrid bugs, gall wasps and eurytomid chalcidoids
A. extensus – France
A. fabicola – Palaearctic
A parasitoid on the gall midge Lasioptera fabae
A. facetus – Russia (Adygea)
A. femoralis – Palaearctic
A parasitoid on various weevils (family Curculionidae) and moths (families Gracillariidae and Lyonetiidae)
A. flavicapitus – Far eastern Russia
A. flavifrons – Italy, Madeira
A parasitoid on the agromyzid fly Cerodontha pygmaea
A. flavovarius – Europe
A parasitoid on various gall midges, also recorded on the gracillariid moth Lithocolletis platani
A. flumenius – Far eastern Russia
A. fonscolombei – Palaearctic
A. foraminifer – France
A. forsteri – Palaearctic
A parasitoid on various gall wasps
A. fukutai – China (Hebei), Taiwan
A parasitoid on various longhorn beetles
A. fulvipes – Palaearctic
A. fusificola – France
A parasitoid on the gall wasp Plagiotrochus fusifex
A. garganensis – Greece, Italy
A. gaus – Europe
A parasitoid on the gall midge Dasineura leguminicola
A. glandicola – France
A parasitoid on the gall wasp Callirhytis glandium
A. gnomus – Palaearctic
A. graciliclava – Greece
A. grahami – Moldova
A parasitoid on curculionid weevils of the genus Lignyodes
A. grandicauda – Far eastern Russia
A. grandii – Palaearctic
A parasitoid on various gall midges
A. gratus – Palaearctic
A parasitoid on various gall midges
A. grylli – Palaearctic
A. habarovi – Far eastern Russia
A. hanka – Far eastern Russia
A. hedqvisti – Palaearctic
A parasitoid on the bark beetle Tomicus minor
A. hians – Madeira
A. holomelas – Hungary
Host unknown but associated with Quercus cerris
A. holoxanthus – Eastern Palaearctic
A. humilis – Western Europe
A parasitoid of gall midges of the genus Mayetiola
A. hyperfuniculus – Far eastern Russia
A. ibericus – Spain
A. ilexi – China (Jiangxi)
A parasitoid on various gall midges
A. impurus – Switzerland
A. incrassatus – Britain
Host unknown but associated with Carex spp
A. invidus – Southern Europe, Near East
A parasitoid on various gall midges
A. ione – Britain
A. krusenschterni – Far eastern Russia
A. lacaena – Britain
A. lachares – Europe
A. lacunatus – Britain
A. larzacensis – Palaearctic
A. laticeps – France
A. leptocerus – Palaearctic
A. leptoneuros – Palaearctic
A parasitoid recorded on various kermesid scale insects and also on the tortricid moth Carpocapsa pomonella and the fellow eulophid Tetrastichus pachyneurus
A. levadiensis – Greece
A. ligus – Britain
A. lituratus – Poland
A. longiclava – Far eastern Russia
A. longipectus – Southern Russia (Astrakhan Oblast)
A. longiscapus – Palaearctic
A parasitoid on various gall midges
A. longispinus – Far eastern Russia
A. longistigma – Far eastern Russia
A. longulus – Europe
A. lutescens – Spain
A parasitoid on the fellow chalcidoid Blascoa ephedrae (Pteromalidae)
A. luteus – Europe
A parasitoid on various gall midges and fellow eulophids (including Aprostocetus elongatus)
A. lycidas – Europe, North Africa
A parasitoid on various gall midges
A. lycidoides – Greece
A. lysippe – Palaearctic
A parasitoid on the gall midge Dasineura crataegi
A. malagensis – Spain
A. mandanis – Europe
A parasitoid on various delphacid bugs
A. masculinus – France
A. massonianae – China (Guizhou)
A parasitoid on the bark beetle Cryphalus massonianus
A. maurus – Hungary
A. mazaeus – Britain
A. menius – Palaearctic
A. meridionalis – Southern Europe
A. meroe – Western Europe
A. metra – Palaearctic
A parasitoid on various gall midges
A. micantulus – Palaearctic
A parasitoid on the gall midge Dasineura abietiperda
A. microocellus – Far eastern Russia
A. mimulus – Greece
A. minimus – Palaearctic
A parasitoid of gall midges of the genus Rabdophaga
A. miridivorus – France, Italy
A parasitoid of various mirid bugs
A. moldavicus – Moldova
A parasitoid on the gall midge Dasineura mali
A. morairensis – Spain
A. muiri – China (Guangdong)
A. mycerinus – Palaearctic
Host unknown but associated with Salix spp
A. myrsus – Britain
A parasitoid on the gall midge Contarinia rumicis
A. natans – Central Russia, Ukraine
A parasitoid on various dytiscid beetles
A. nigriventris – Far eastern Russia
A. novatus – Europe
A parasitoid on the gall midge Agevillea abietis
A. nubigenus – Palaearctic
A. nymphis – Britain
A. obliquus – Palaearctic
A. occidentalis – Southern Europe, Canary Islands, Madeira
A. oculisetatus – Far eastern Russia
A. oreophilus – Europe
A parasitoid recorded on the leaf beetle Cryptocephalus pini and the gall wasp Cynips caputmedusae
A. orestes – Central Europe
A. orithyia – Palaearctic
A parasitoid of various flies (gall midges and the chloropid Lipara lucens)
A. oropus – Britain
A. ovivorax – Europe
A parasitoid of the cricket Oecanthus pellucens
A. pachyneuros – Europe
A parasitoid on various kermesid scale insects and fellow chalcidoids
A. pallidipedes – Far eastern Russia
A. pallidipes – Japan
A. palustris – Northern Europe
A. pantshenkoi – Southern Russia
A. paralus – Britain
A. peischula – Far eastern Russia
A. perfulvescens – Greece
A. perone – Northern Europe
A. phillyreae – Palaearctic
Host unknown but associated with Phillyrea spp
A. phineus – Europe
A. phloeophthori – Palaearctic
A parasitoid on the bark beetle Phloeophthorus rhododactylus
A. phragmiticola – Palaearctic
A parasitoid on the gall midge Giraudiella inclusa
A. phragmitinus – Europe
Host unknown but associated with Phragmites spp
A. ping – Spain
A. plagioderae – Moldova
A parasitoid on the leaf beetle Plagiodera versicolora
A. plangon – Britain
A. planiusculus – Palaearctic
A parasitoid on sesiid moths of the genus Chamaesphecia
A. polygoni – Central Europe
Host unknown but associated with Polygonum persicaria
A. popovi – Far eastern Russia
A. problematicus – Hungary
A parasitoid recorded on the gall wasp Chilaspis nitida and gracillariid moths of the genus Lithocolletis
A. productus – Palaearctic
A. prolidice – Palaearctic
A. prolixus – China (Hebei), Taiwan
A parasitoid on the longhorn beetle Apriona germarii
A. prosymna – Britain
A. pseudopodiellus – Europe
A parasitoid on lestid damselflies of the genus Lestes
A. ptarmicae – Europe
A parasitoid of gall midges of the genus Rhopalomyia
A. rhacius – Palaearctic
A parasitoid of the gall midge Dasineura trifolii
A. rhipheus – Europe
A. rhode – Britain
A. rimskykorsakovi – Central Russia
A. roesellae – Palaearctic
A parasitoid on various gall midges, also recorded on fellow chalcidoids and the yponomeutid moth Argyresthia conjugella
A. rubi – Palaearctic
A parasitoid of the gall midge Lasioptera rubi
A. rubicola – Palaearctic
A parasitoid of the gall midge Lasioptera rubi
A. rufescens – Western Europe
A parasitoid of the gall wasp Neuroterus quercusbaccarum
A. rufiscapus – Britain
A. rufus – Europe
A parasitoid on dytiscid beetles of the genus Dytiscus
A. rumicis – Northern Europe
A parasitoid on brentid weevils of the genus Apion
A. salictorum – Palaearctic
A parasitoid on various gall midges
A. schambala – Far eastern Russia
A. scoticus – Britain
A parasitoid of the gall midge Jaapiella veronicae
A. sensuna – Switzerland
A. serratularum – Palaearctic
A parasitoid on various tephritid flies, also on gelechiid moths of the genus Metzneria
A. setosulus – Central Europe
A. sibiricus – Far eastern Russia
A parasitoid of the coccid scale insect Eulecanium secretum
A. silaceus – Greece
A. silvestris – Far eastern Russia
A. spassk – Far eastern Russia
A. specularis – France
A. stenus – Europe
A. stigmaticalis – Britain
Host unknown but associated with Betula pubescens
A. subanellatus – Palaearctic
Host unknown but associated with Agrostis spp.
A. subcylindricus – Czech Republic
A. subplanus – Central Europe
A. subterraneus – Hungary
A parasitoid of the gall midge Planetella frireni
A. suevius – Europe
A parasitoid on various leaf beetles
A. taiga – Far eastern Russia
A. tanaceticola – Northern Europe
A parasitoid of the gall midge Rhopalomyia tanaceticola
A. taxi – Europe
Host unknown but associated with Taxus baccata
A. tenuiradialis – Europe
A. tiliaceae – Czech Republic
A parasitoid of the gall midge Didymomyia tiliacea
A. tilicola – Palaearctic
A parasitoid of the gall midge Contarinia tiliarum
A. tompanus – Palaearctic
A parasitoid on apionid beetles of the genus Apion
A. torquentis – Palaearctic
A parasitoid on various gall midges
A. totis – Britain
A. trjapitzini – Palaearctic, Near East
A parasitoid on various coccid scale insects, also recorded on a fellow chalcidoid, the encyrtid Microterys hortulanus
A. truncatulus – France
A. tymber – Palaearctic
A parasitoid on various gall midges
A. vaccus – Britain
A. vassolensis – Central Europe
A. veronicae – Britain
A parasitoid of the gall midge Jaapiella veronicae
A. verticalis – Britain
A. verutus – Palaearctic
Host unknown but associated with various grasses
A. viatorum – Madeira
A. vicinus – Far eastern Russia
A. viridescens – Central Europe
A parasitoid of the gall midge Cecidomyia baeri
A. viridinitens – Palaearctic
A. volgodonicus – Southern Russia
A. voranus – Britain
A. westwoodii – Central and Southern Europe
A parasitoid of gall midges of the genus Asphondylia
A. wrangeli – Far eastern Russia
A. xanthomelas – Central Europe
A. xanthopus – Palaearctic
A parasitoid on various moths, also recorded on the bark beetle Carphoborus minimus
A. xeuxes – Britain
A. zerovae – Ukraine, Central Russia
A. zoilus – Palaearctic
Host unknown but associated with Alopecurus pratensis

Indomalayan species

A. ajmerensis – India (Rajasthan)
A parasitoid on the mealybug Coccidohystrix insolita
A. annulicornis – India (Rajasthan)
A parasitoid on the mealybug Coccidohystrix insolita
A. asphondyliae – India (Karnataka)
A parasitoid on the gall midge Asphondylia pongamiae
A. bangaloricus – India (Karnataka)
A parasitoid on the kerriid scale insect Kerria lacca
A. basalis – Indonesia (South Moluccas)
A. coimbatorensis – India (Andhra Pradesh, Tamil Nadu)
A parasitoid on various gall midges
A. distinguendus – Indonesia (South Moluccas)
A parasitoid on the delphacid bug Perkinsiella saccharicida
A. flavidus – India (Andhra Pradesh)
A. holochlorus – Indonesia (South Moluccas)
A. homochromus – Indonesia (South Moluccas)
A parasitoid on the delphacid bug Perkinsiella vastatrix
A. java – Indonesia (Java, Bali)
A. kuriani – India (Orissa)
A parasitoid on various pyralid moths
A. lasallei – India (Uttarakhand)
A parasitoid on various coccid scale insects
A. lecanii – Indonesia (Java, Bali)
A parasitoid on various coccid scale insects
A. maculatus – India (Uttar Pradesh)
A parasitoid on the mealybug Ferrisia virgata
A. metallicus – Indonesia (South Moluccas)
A. nainitalensis – India (Uttarakhand, Uttar Pradesh)
A parasitoid on the kerriid bug Kerria lacca
A. nigricornis – India (Uttar Pradesh)
A parasitoid on the mealybug Nipaecoccus vastator
A. plesispae – Indonesia (Java, Bali)
A parasitoid on the leaf beetle Plesispa reichei
A. psyllidis – India (Uttar Pradesh)
Host unknown but associated with Grewia asiatica
A. purpureus – Pakistan, India, Bangladesh, Malaysia
A parasitoid on a wide range of scale insects, also recorded on some fellow chalcidoids
A. sankarani – India
A parasitoid on various gall midges
A. santalinus – India (Karnataka)
A parasitoid on the coccid scale insect Ceroplastes actiniformis
A. tarsalis – Indonesia (South Moluccas)
A parasitoid on delphacid bugs of the genus Perkinsiella
A. versicolor – Sri Lanka
A parasitoid recorded on various hymenopterans and moths
A. yoshimotoi – India (Uttar Pradesh)
Host unknown but associated with Mangifera indica

Afrotropical species

A. aeruginosus – Seychelles
A. agnatus – Seychelles
A. ambilobei – Madagascar
A. ankaratrae – Madagascar
A. aphloiae – Madagascar
A. aspidomorphae – Kenya, Uganda
A parasitoid on tortoise beetles of the genera Aspidomorpha and Conchyloctenia
A. brevistylus – Central Africa
A parasitoid on the diopsid fly Diopsis thoracica
A. camerounensis – Cameroon
A. cassidocida – Senegal
A parasitoid on tortoise beetles of the genus Aspidomorpha
A. dineuri – Republic of Congo
A parasitoid recorded on the pyralid moth Sylepta derogata and the braconid wasp Apanteles sagax
A. dolichocerus – Seychelles
A. ghananensis – Ghana
A. gowdeyi – Uganda
A parasitoid on the coccid scale insect Pulvinaria jacksoni
A. gravans – Eritrea, Tanzania
A parasitoid on the coccid scale insect Coccus viridis and the mealybug Ferrisiana chrysophyllae
A. hanangensis – Tanzania
A. harongae – Madagascar
A. hofferi – Algeria
A. lamiicidus – Ghana, Nigeria
A parasitoid on longhorn beetles of the genus Tragocephala
A. leroyi – Democratic Republic of the Congo
A. leucopterae – Tanzania
A parasitoid on various lyonetiid moths of the genus Leucoptera, also recorded on fellow eulophids of the genus Eulophus
A. longiscutulum – Tanzania
A. marinikius – Algeria
A. melichlorus – Ghana
A. microfuniculus – Algeria
A. negetae – Senegal
A parasitoid on the noctuid moth Negeta luminosa
A. nigriceps – Seychelles
A. pauliani – Madagascar
A parasitoid on gall-producing insects on Plectronia spp
A. phytolymae – Côte d'Ivoire
A parasitoid of the psyllid bug Phytolyma lata
A. procerae – West Africa
A parasitoid on various gall midges, also recorded on the pyralid moth Chilo phaeosema
A. regnieri – Congo, Kenya
A. roseveari – Central Africa
A parasitoid on the psyllid bug Phytolyma lata
A. salebrosus – Central Africa
A parasitoid on the psyllid bug Phytolyma lata
A. scutellaris – Tanzania
A. senegalensis – Senegal
A. spinicornis – Rwanda
A. stictococci – West Africa
A parasitoid on stictococcid scale insects of the genus Stictococcus
A. theioneurus – Kenya, Madagascar, Seychelles
A parasitoid recorded on the pyralid moth Chilo partellus and the braconid wasp Cotesia sesamiae
A. trichionotus – Central Africa
A parasitoid on the psyllid bug Phytolyma lata
A. ugandaensis – Uganda
A parasitoid on the stictococcid scale insect Stictococcus gowdeyi

Nearctic species

A. ajax – Northern United States
A. americanus
A. animus – Mexico, New Mexico
A. anthophilus – South eastern Canada, north eastern United States
A parasitoid recorded on the gall midge Rhopalomyia anthophila and the totricid moth Zeiraphera ratzeburgiana
A. anthracinus – Western North America
A parasitoid on the buprestid beetle Agrilus angelicus
A. banksii – Eastern United States
A parasitoid on a fellow eulophid, Horismenus nitans
A. blastophagi – Eastern United States
A parasitoid on the gall wasp Callirhytis blastophaga
A. blattae – Eastern United States
A parasitoid on cockroaches of the genus Parcoblatta
A. burksi – California
A parasitoid on various gall wasps
A. cassidis – Eastern United States
A parasitoid on various leaf beetles
A. cincinnatus
A. esurus – Canada, United States
A parasitoid recorded on a very wide range of insects – mainly Lepidoptera (Arctiidae, Lasiocampidae, Lymantriidae, Noctuidae, Oecophoridae, Pyralidae, Tortricidae) but also Coleophoridae (Coccinellidae), Diptera (Tephritidae) and Hymenoptera (Encyrtidae)
A. faustus – Central and western United States
A parasitoid on tephritid flies of the genus Rhagoletis
A. florida – Florida
A. garryana – Western Canada and United States
A parasitoid of various gall wasps
A. gelastus – Florida
A parasitoid on various psyllid and triozid bugs
A. gibboni – Central United States
A parasitoid on the languriid beetle Languria mozardi
A. granulatus
A. hesperius – Illinois
A parasitoid on the gall wasp Diplolepis ignota
A. hibus – California
A parasitoid on various gall midges
A. hillmeadia – Maryland
A. homeri – Western United States
A parasitoid on various gall midges
A. impexus – Virginia
A parasitoid on the gall wasp Disholcaspis quercusglobulus
A. irvingi – New Mexico
A. ischnopterae – Central and eastern United States
A parasitoid on various ectobiid cockroaches
A. juniperi – Canada, northern United States
A parasitoid recorded on various hosts including the eriophyid mite Trisetacus quadrisetus, the curculionid weevil Anthonomus juniperinus and various gall midges
A. kansasia – Kansas
A. lasius – Central United States
A parasitoid on the gall midge Asteromyia agrostis
A. longicorpus – New Mexico
A parasitoid on the tortricid moth Rhyacionia frustrana
A. marcovitchi – United States
A parasitoid recorded on various hosts including gall midges, fellow chalcidoids and the curculionid weevil Anthonomus juniperinus
A. marilandia – Maryland
A. meltoftei – Greenland
A. milleri – California
A parasitoid on the gelechiid moth Recurvaria milleri
A. mymaridis – Illinois
A parasitoid on lestid damselflies of the genus Lestes
A. nebraskensis – Eastern Canada, United States
A parasitoid on various gall midges, also recorded on the curculionid weevil Hypera nigrirostris
A. neuroteri – Central and eastern United States
A parasitoid on gall wasps of the genus Neuroterus
A. novus – Central and eastern United States
A. Oklahoma – Central United States
A parasitoid on fellow chalcidoids (family Eurytomidae)
A. oncideridis – West Virginia
A parasitoid on the longhorn beetle Oncideres cingulata
A. orbitalis – Mexico, California
A. oviductus – Maryland
A. pandora – Oregon
A parasitoid on the saturniid moth Coloradia pandora
A. pattersonae – United States
A parasitoid on various gall wasps
A. politi – Eastern and southern United States
A parasitoid on the gall wasp Xanthoteras politum
A. polynemae – Central and eastern United States
A parasitoid on various Odonata and the fairyfly Polynema needhami
A. psyllaephagus – Arizona
A parasitoid on the triozid bug Trioza collaris
A. punctatifrons – Arizona
A parasitoid on the lyonetiid moth Paraleucoptera albella
A. rosae – North America
A parasitoid on gall wasps of the genus Diplolepis
A. semiauraticeps – United States
A parasitoid on various gall midges
A. silvaticus – North America
A parasitoid on various moths, also recorded on the diprionid sawfly Neodiprion swainei
A. smilax - Florida
gall inducer on Smilax havanensis
A. strobilus – North America
A parasitoid on various gall midges, also recorded on the tortricid moth Barbara colfaxiana and the ichneumon wasp Glypta evetriae
A. tesserus – Northern United States
A parasitoid on various gall midges
A. varicornis – Northeastern United States
A parasitoid on various tortricid moths
A. verrucarii – United States
A parasitoid on gall wasps of the genus Neuroterus

Neotropical species

A. acutipennis – Grenada, Saint Vincent and the Grenadines
A. arachnophagus – Argentina, Uruguay
A parasitoid on various araneid and theridiid spiders.
A. ashmeadi – Grenada
A. baccharidis – Chile
A. bahiensis – Brazil (Bahia)
Host unknown but associated with Ocotea opoifera
A. basilaris – Grenada, Saint Vincent and the Grenadines
A. basimaculata – Nicaragua
A. bondari – Brazil (Bahia)
A parasitoid on the pauliniid grasshopper Paulinia elegans
A. brasiliensis – Brazil (Mato Grosso)
A. cacus – Brazil (Bahia)
A. chapadae – South America
A parasitoid recorded on a wide range of insects including weevils, gall midges, coccid scale insects, gelechiid moths and braconid wasps
A. cleonica – Brazil (Bahia)
A. colliguayae – Chile
Phytophagous, causing galls on Colliguaja odorifera
A. coxalis – Grenada
A. cupreus – Grenada, Saint Vincent and the Grenadines
A. daimachus – Brazil (Bahia)
A. elevatus – Grenada
A. februus – Brazil (Bahia)
A. femoratus – Grenada, Saint Vincent and the Grenadines
A. hyalinipennis – Paraguay
A. ignigenus – Argentina
A. infulatus – Argentina
A. longicornis – Grenada, Saint Vincent and the Grenadines
A. melleus – Brazil (Pará)
A. narcaeus – Chile
A. naucles – Chile
Host unknown but associated with Prosopis tamarugo
A. norax – Chile
A parasitoid on the lasiocampid moth Macromphalia dedecora
A. phryno – Brazil (Bahia)
A. polypaea – Chile
A. punctifrons – Saint Vincent and the Grenadines
A. riverai – South America
A parasitoid of theridiid spiders of the genus Latrodectus
A. similis – Grenada
A. socialis – Chile
A. thomasi – Chile
A. vaquitarum – South America, Caribbean
A parasitoid recorded on the curculionid weevil Lachnopus coffeae and the elachistid moth Donacivola saccharella
A. viridis – Grenada
A. vulgaris – Grenada, Saint Vincent and the Grenadines
A. xenocles – Chile
A parasitoid of coccid scale insects of the genus Ceroplastes
A. zemani – South America
A parasitoid of various coccid scale insects

Australasian species

A. acomatus – Queensland
A. acuminativentris – Queensland
A. acuminatus – Queensland
A. acutiventris – Queensland
A. aeneithorax – Queensland
A. aeneoculex – Queensland
A parasitoid of leaf beetles of the genus Galeruca
A. aeneon – Queensland
A. aenosus – Queensland
A. aeneus – Queensland
A. affinis – Queensland
A. anna – Queensland
A. arses – Tasmania
A. atrellus – Queensland
A. atristigma – Queensland
A. atriventris – Queensland
A. aura – Queensland
A. auriflavus – Queensland
A parasitoid associated with gall producing insects on Eucalyptus
A. aurios – Queensland
A. auriscutellum – Queensland
A. auriventris – Queensland
A. australicus – Queensland
A. baucis – Western Australia
A. bicolor – Queensland
A. bilongifasciatus – Queensland
A. boswelli – Queensland
A. boussingaulti – Queensland
A. brevis – Queensland
A. brevistigma – South Australia
A. brunneiventris – Queensland
A. brunneus – Queensland
A. burmeisteri – Northern Territory
A. cinctiventer – Queensland
A. cinctiventris – New South Wales
A. cobdeni – Queensland
A. consimilis – Queensland
A. consobrinus – Queensland
A parasitoid associated with gall producing insects on Eucalyptus
A. cressoni – Queensland
A. culex – Queensland
A. darwini – Queensland
A. darwinianus – Queensland
A. decii – Queensland
A. dei – Queensland
A. dymas – Tasmania
A. eucalypti – South Australia
A parasitoid on fellow chalcidoids: recorded on Rhicnopletella spp. (Eulophidae) and Neomegastigmus ater (Torymidae)
A. fannius – Tasmania
A. fasciativenter – Tasmania
A. fasciativentris – New South Wales
A. fasciativentrosus – Queensland
A. filiformis – New South Wales
A. flavellinus – Queensland
A. flavellus – Queensland
A. flavicaput – Queensland
A. flavicollis – Queensland
A. flavicornis – Queensland
A. flavios – Queensland
A. flavipostscutellum – Queensland
A. flaviscapus – Queensland
A. flaviscutellum – Queensland
A. flavobasalis – Queensland
A. flavus – Queensland
A. froggatti – New South Wales
A. fulgens – Queensland
A. fulvipostscutellum – Queensland
A. fuscipennatus – South Australia
A. fuscipennis – Queensland
A. fuscitibiae – Tasmania
A. fuscosus – Queensland
A. fuscus – Queensland
A. gloriosus – Queensland
A. glycon – Tasmania
A. gobius – Queensland
A. gregi – Queensland
A. grotiusi – Queensland
A. guttatus – Queensland
A. haeckeli – Queensland
A. handeli – Queensland
A. hetaericos – Queensland
A. hexguttativentris – Queensland
A. hyalinus – Queensland
A. imago – New South Wales
A. imperialis – Queensland
A. indigenus – Queensland
A. inghamensis – Queensland
A. intentatus – Queensland
A. io – Queensland
A. ion – Queensland
A. kelloggi – Queensland
A. latithorax – Queensland
A. lelaps – Western Australia
A. lenini – Queensland
A. limbus – Tasmania
A. lineatus – Queensland
A. longiclavus – Queensland
A. longipennis – Queensland
A. longiventris – Queensland
A. lustris – Queensland
A. mahometi – Queensland
A. marginatus – Queensland
A. margiscutellum – Queensland
A. margiscutum – Queensland
A parasitoid associated with gall producing insects on Eucalyptus
A. margiventris – Queensland
A. margiventrosus – Queensland
A. maximus – Queensland
A. meridialis – Queensland
A. meridianus – Victoria
A. mesmeri – Queensland
A. minutissimus – Queensland
A. mirus – Queensland
A. misericordia – Queensland
A. montanus – Queensland
A. monticola – Queensland
A. morum – Queensland
A. multifasciatus – Queensland
A. necopinatus – Queensland
A. neis – Tasmania
A. nelsonensis – Queensland
A. nigriclava – Queensland
A. nigrithorax – Queensland
A. nomadis – Queensland
A. novifasciatus – Queensland
A. nubilipennis – Queensland
A. nugatorius – Queensland
A. nympha – Queensland
A. obscurus – Queensland
A. occultus – Queensland
A. octoguttatus – New South Wales
A. pallidicaput – Queensland
A. pallidiventris – Queensland
A. parvulus – Queensland
A. pax – Queensland
A. perkinsi – Queensland
A. perobscurus – South Australia
A. perpulcher – Queensland
A. platoni – Queensland
A. polychromus – Northern Territory
A. pomosus – Queensland
A. pontiac – South Australia
A. postscutellatus – Queensland
A. proto – Tasmania
A. pulcher – Queensland
A. pulchrinotatus – Queensland
A. pullus – Queensland
A. purpureicorpus – Queensland
A. purpureithorax – Queensland
A. purpureivarius – Queensland
A. quadrifasciatus – Queensland
A. quadriguttativentris – Queensland
A. quadrimaculae – Queensland
A. quadrimaculatus – Queensland
A. queenslandensis – Queensland
A. quinqnigrimaculae – Victoria
A parasitoid associated with gall producing insects on Eucalyptus
A. rieki – Queensland
A. rotundiventris – Queensland
A. rufiscutellum – Queensland
A. saintpierrei – Queensland
A parasitoid on various gall midges
A. saltensis – Queensland
A. salto – Queensland
A. saltus – Queensland
A. sannio – Queensland
A. sannion – Queensland
A. schilleri – Queensland
A. secus – Queensland
A parasitoid associated with gall producing insects on Eucalyptus
A. semiflaviceps – Queensland
A. septemguttatus – Queensland
A. sexguttatus – Queensland
A. seymourensis – Queensland
A. silvarum – Queensland
A. silvensis – Queensland
A. speciosissimus – Queensland
A. speciosus – Queensland
A. spissigradus – Queensland
A. subfasciativentris – Queensland
A. sublustris – Queensland
A. sulcatus – Queensland
A. sulfureiventris – Queensland
A parasitoid on various gall midges
A. susurrus – Queensland
A. tarsatus – Queensland
A. teiae – Queensland
A parasitoid on lymantriid moths of the genus Teia, also recorded on the leaf beetle Galeruca semipullata
A. tenuis – Queensland
A. thalesi – Queensland
A. transversifasciatus – New South Wales
A. tricolor – Queensland
A parasitoid associated with gall producing insects on Eucalyptus
A. trifasciatus – Queensland
A. trimaculosus – Queensland
A. unfasciativentris – Queensland
A. valens – Tasmania
A. varicolor – Queensland
A. variegatus – Queensland
A. verus – Victoria
A. victoriensis – Victoria
A parasitoid on various gall wasps
A. viridicyaneus – Queensland
A. viridiflavus – Queensland
A. viridiscapus – Queensland
A. viridithorax – Queensland
A. vivatus – Queensland
A. wallacei – Queensland
A. walsinghami – Victoria
A. xanther – Northern Territory, Queensland
A. xanthicolor – Queensland
A. xenares – New South Wales, Tasmania
A. zaleucus – Tasmania

References

External links
Fauna Europaea
Nomina Insecta Nearctica
Universal Chalcidoidea Database

Eulophidae
Cosmopolitan arthropods